HR is a Japanese idol girl group formed in 2010. Nine of their singles have charted in the weekly Oricon Singles Chart.

Members

Discography

Albums

Singles

References

Japanese idol groups
Japanese girl groups